Ion Dolănescu (25 January 1944 – 19 March 2009) was a Romanian singer of folk music and a politician.

He was married to singer Maria Ciobanu. He was a member of the Greater Romania Party and was elected to the Chamber of Deputies from 2000 to 2004.

Songs
 M-am născut printre Carpați
 Gorjule, grădină dulce
 De când sunt pe-acest pământ Mândro, când ne iubeam noi Să-mi trăiască nevestica Neuitata mea, Maria Au, lele, vino-ncoa (with Maria Ciobanu) Face-m-aș privighetoare (with Maria Ciobanu) Pe sub dealul cu izvorul (with Maria Ciobanu) Pe sub creanga vișinie Tare-i dulce porcul de Crăciun (with Vali Vijelie) Mare ți-e grădina Doamne, iar eu din ea fac parte! Hora de zambalagii Și-am murit și am trait Cu paharu' nu-ți mai trece doru Iarna nu-i ca vara''

References

External links
Ion Dolănescu's Curriculum Vitae at the Romanian Chamber of Deputies website

1944 births
2009 deaths
People from Dâmbovița County
20th-century Romanian male singers
20th-century Romanian singers
Members of the Chamber of Deputies (Romania)
Greater Romania Party politicians
Burials at Bellu Cemetery